Ana Maria Măzăreanu (born 4 February 1993) is a Romanian handball player who plays as a goalkeeper for the Gloria Bistrița and the Romanian national team.

She represented Romania at the 2020 European Women's Handball Championship.

Achievements 
Cupa României : 
Bronze Medalist: 2017

References

External links

1993 births
Living people
Sportspeople from Iași
Romanian female handball players
CS Minaur Baia Mare (women's handball) players